Willow is a 2019 Macedonian film by Milcho Manchevski. It is a poignant tale of three women coping with issues of control over their bodies, tradition and adoption. The film premiered at the Rome Film Festival in 2019. А Macedonian-Belgian-Hungarian-Albanian coproduction, it screened at a number of international film festivals, winning several awards: Silver Palm at Mostra de Valencia, best director at Raindance, best film at Cinequest, Manuel De Oliveira Award at Fantasporto etc.

Plot 
Three women – one medieval, two contemporary – struggle to become mothers. They have not set out to change the world or society, but their struggles with tradition, loyalty, adoption and control over their bodies make them unlikely heroines.

Cast 
 Sara Klimoska as Donka
 Natalija Teodosieva as Rodna
 Kamka Tocinovski as Katerina
 NIkola Risteski as Milan
 Petar Caranovic as Kire
 Nenad Nacev as Branko
 Ratka Radmanovic as Grandma Srebra
 Petar Mircevski as Stavre
 Blagoj Chorevski as Mancho
 Laze Manaskovski as Father Avram

Awards 
Raindance - Best Director, 2020
Fantasporto - Manuel De Oliveira Award, 2020
 Wellington Independent Film Festival - Best Feature Film, 2020
Cinequest - Best Narrative Feature Film, 2020
Mostra de Valencia - Silver Palm, 2020
Stony Brook Film Festival - Jury Award Best Feature, 2021

See also
 List of submissions to the 93rd Academy Awards for Best International Feature Film
 List of Macedonian submissions for the Academy Award for Best International Feature Film

References

External links

Willow Official YouTube Channel
Willow Official Vimeo Channel
Milcho Manchevski Official Website
Reviews
Hollywood Reporter
Screen International
Deadline
Variety: ‘Willow’ Review: Subtle, Profound Portrait of Longed-For Motherhood, Raised To The Power Of Three
Cineuropa: Review
Variety: Kino Lorber Acquires Raindance Prize-Winning Macedonian Film ‘Willow’

2019 films
Macedonian drama films
Macedonian-language films
2019 drama films
Films directed by Milcho Manchevski